Bintulu is a federal constituency in Bintulu Division (Bintulu District, Tatau District and Sebauh District) and Miri Division (Subis District), Sarawak, Malaysia, that has been represented in the Dewan Rakyat since 1971.

The federal constituency was created in the 1968 redistribution and is mandated to return a single member to the Dewan Rakyat under the first past the post voting system.

Demographics 
第15届全国大选-东方日报-2022

History

Polling districts 
According to the gazette issued on 31 October 2022, the Bintulu constituency has a total of 28 polling districts.

Representation history

State constituency

Current state assembly members

Local governments

Election results

References

Sarawak federal constituencies